Weeper may refer to:
 A person who cries
 Weeper (DC Comics), a comic book supervillain
 Pleurants or "weepers", statues used to decorate tomb monuments
 A weep, or hole in masonry used for drainage